Monique Smith may refer to:
 Monique Smith (Canadian politician), member of the Legislative Assembly of Ontario
 Monique Smith (Ohio politician), member of the Ohio House of Representatives
 Monique Gray Smith, Canadian writer of children's and young adult literature